Diaphera is a genus of air-breathing land snails, terrestrial pulmonate gastropod mollusks in the family Diapheridae.  

Diaphera is the type genus of the family Diapheridae.

The genus Diaphera is generally poorly known.

Distribution
The distribution of Diaphera includes South-East Asia: Myanmar, Thailand, Cambodia, the Philippines.

Species
There more than 50 species in the genus Diaphera including:
 Diaphera anctostoma (Quadras & Möllendorff, 1895)
 Diaphera aptycha (Möllendorff, 1895)
 Diaphera brevicollis (Blanford, 1899)
 Diaphera canaliculata (Quadras & Möllendorff, 1896)
 Diaphera cardiostoma (Quadras & Möllendorff, 1894)
 Diaphera connectens Bruggen, 1974
 Diaphera cristatella (Möllendorff, 1896)
 Diaphera cumingiana Pfeiffer, 1845 - type species of the genus Diaphera
 Diaphera cuspidata (Möllendorff, 1895)
 Diaphera cylindrelloidea (Stoliczka, 1871)
 Diaphera cylindrica (Quadras & Möllendorff, 1895)
 Diaphera densecostulata (Möllendorff, 1901)
 Diaphera devians (Möllendorff, 1890)
 Diaphera dicraspedia (Möllendorff, 1898)
 Diaphera dilophia (Quadras & Möllendorff, 1895)
 Diaphera eulophia (Quadras & Möllendorff, 1895)
 Diaphera euryomphala (Möllendorff, 1895)
 Diaphera eutrachela (Möllendorff, 1890)
 Diaphera helenae Vermeulen, 1990
 Diaphera hidalgoi (Möllendorff, 1888)
 Diaphera homalogyra (Quadras & Möllendorff, 1895)
 Diaphera kobelti (Möllendorff, 1898)
 Diaphera kochiana (Möllendorff, 1888)
 Diaphera lini Z.-Y. Chen & Páll-Gergely, 2020
 Diaphera locardi (Hidalgo, 1890)
 Diaphera macrostoma (Quadras & Möllendorff, 1894)
 Diaphera moellendorffi (Hidalgo, 1889)
 Diaphera morleti (Hidalgo, 1889)
 Diaphera nitidula (Quadras & Möllendorff, 1894)
 Diaphera obliquapex Bruggen, 1974
 Diaphera otostoma (Quadras & Möllendorff, 1894)
 Diaphera palawanica Bruggen, 1974
 Diaphera pleistogyra (Quadras & Möllendorff, 1895)
 Diaphera polita Páll-Gergely, 2020
 Diaphera porrecta (Martens, 1884)
 Diaphera prima Panha, 2010
 Diaphera quadrasi (Möllendorff, 1887)
 Diaphera samarica (Möllendorff, 1896)
 Diaphera saurini Benthem Jutting, 1962
 Diaphera seatoni (Beddome, 1891)
 Diaphera sericina (Möllendorff, 1887)
 Diaphera solenidium (Möllendorff, 1896)
 Diaphera strangulata (Möllendorff, 1894)
 Diaphera strophostoma (Quadras & Möllendorff, 1896)
 Diaphera telescopium (Möllendorff, 1896)
 Diaphera torta (Quadras & Möllendorff, 1894)
 Diaphera truncatella (Möllendorff, 1896)
 Diaphera tuba (Möllendorff, 1887)
 Diaphera turbanophora Páll-Gergely & Grego, 2020
 Diaphera unicristata (Möllendorff, 1894)
 Diaphera wilfordii Dance, 1970
Synonym
 Diaphera (Huttonella) kohllarseni Haas, 1936: synonym of Gulella kohllarseni (Haas, 1936) (original combination)

References

Further reading 
 Bruggen, A.C. van. (1974). Streptaxidae (Mollusca, Gastropoda, Pulmonata) from Palawan, Philippine Islands. Proceedings of the Koninklijke Nederlandse Akademie van Wetenschappen, Series C, 77(3): 272–282
 Bruggen A. C van (1975). "New data on Cylindrella cumingiana Pfeiffer, 1845, type species of the genus Diaphera Albers, 1850 (Mollusca: Gastropoda: Pulmonata: Streptaxidae)". Proceedings of the Koninklÿke Nederlandse Akademie van Wetenschappen, Amsterdam series C 78: 167–171.
 Vermeulen J. J. (1990). "Notes on the non marine mollusks of the island of Borneo 1. The genus Diaphera (Gastropoda: Pulmonata: Streptaxidae)". Basteria 54: 159–165.
 Bank, R. A. (2017). Classification of the Recent terrestrial Gastropoda of the World. Last update: July 16th, 2017

External links
 Albers, J. C. (1850). Die Heliceen nach natürlicher Verwandtschaft systematisch geordnet. Berlin: Enslin. 262 pp
 Albers, J. C.; Martens, E. von. (1860). Die Heliceen nach natürlicher Verwandtschaft systematisch geordnet von Joh. Christ. Albers. Ed. 2. Pp. i-xviii, 1-359. Leipzig: Engelman
 Páll-Gergely, B., Hunyadi, A., Grego, J., Sajan, S., Tripathy, B. & Chen, Z.-Y. [Zheyu. (2020). A review of the Diapheridae (Gastropoda: Eupulmonata: Streptaxoidea), with special emphasis on India and Myanmar. Raffles Bulletin of Zoology. 68: 682–718]

External links

Diapheridae